M6 Music Black was a French television own and operated by M6, devoted to play contemporary R&B and hip hop music.

External links
Official Website

Music television channels
Defunct television channels in France
French-language television stations
Television channels and stations established in 2005
Television channels and stations disestablished in 2015
2005 establishments in France
2015 disestablishments in France
Music organizations based in France